"For Your Eyes Only" is the theme to the 12th James Bond movie of the same name, written by Bill Conti and Mick Leeson, and performed by Scottish singer Sheena Easton. The song reached number four on the US Billboard Hot 100, and number eight on the UK Singles Chart. It was nominated for Best Original Song at the Academy Awards in 1982.

Background

Conti – who was also responsible for the film's score – had originally written the song thinking about Donna Summer or Dusty Springfield, singers he thought "fit the Bond style". Film studio United Artists suggested Sheena Easton, an up-and-coming singer who had recently scored a No.1 hit in America with "Morning Train". Conti heard Easton's debut album Take My Time and felt unimpressed but decided to work with her in the song after meeting Easton in person.

Leeson's lyrics originally used "for your eyes only" only as the final line, as the lyricist felt he could only use the phrase as a conclusion. After credit sequence artist Maurice Binder complained about having to synchronize the unveiling of the title with it being said in the theme song, Conti decided to work with Leeson to write lyrics that opened with "for your eyes only". The US band Blondie had previously been asked to write the title song but it was rejected in favour of Conti's by the Bond producers. (Blondie's finished recording, a completely different song also called "For Your Eyes Only", appeared on their 1982 album The Hunter).

Easton is the only artist (to date) to be seen singing the theme song to a Bond movie during its opening titles, as Maurice Binder liked Easton's appearance and decided to add her to the credits. Her seductive appearance in these clips was, according to Roger Moore, more sexy than any of the Bond girls, although Easton herself states that the filming process was very unglamorous. In particular, Binder had to attach Easton to a chair so she would be immobile during a take where the camera zooms on the singer's lips.

This was one of the few Bond themes not to have a contribution by John Barry. The song was produced by Christopher Neil, who was Easton's regular producer at the time.

The song was released as a single in June 1981, at the same time as the film's launch. It became a worldwide hit, reaching the top ten in the UK, number 1 in the Netherlands and top five in the US. It remains one of Easton's biggest hits and is included on compilation soundtrack albums.

Record World said that Easton's vocal shows "overwhelming vocal range and power."

Music video

Two different music videos for the song were released. The first was the Maurice Binder title sequence from the film, but with the credits removed (therefore just showing Easton performing the song). The second was more conventional and was directed by Steve Barron.

Chart history

Weekly charts

Year-end charts

See also
 James Bond music
 Outline of James Bond

References

1981 singles
1980s ballads
Songs from James Bond films
European Hot 100 Singles number-one singles
Dutch Top 40 number-one singles
Number-one singles in Norway
Number-one singles in Switzerland
Sheena Easton song
Sheena Easton songs
Song recordings produced by Christopher Neil
Music videos directed by Steve Barron
Songs written by Bill Conti
Pop ballads
Songs written by Mick Leeson
1981 songs
Liberty Records singles